Jack Fryer may refer to:

Jack Fryer (footballer, born 1877), English footballer
Jack Fryer (footballer, born 1911), English footballer
John Denis Fryer (known as Jack Fryer), Australian soldier and university student

See also
John Fryer (disambiguation)